Virakesari  is one of the leading Tamil daily newspapers in Sri Lanka. It is the oldest and the largest circulated Tamil Newspaper in Sri Lanka. Virakesari is owned by Express Newspapers (Ceylon) (Private) Limited, a leading print and web media organization in Sri Lanka.

History 
Virakesari was founded by PPR. Subramanian in the first half of 20th century. Subramanian was an entrepreneur and journalist from the village Avanipatti in Tamil Nadu, India.

Upon immigrating from India to British Ceylon, he saw the conditions of the Indian Labourers and decided that he would establish a newspaper to promote justice and equality for those people by publishing a newspaper with a distinct voice of its own.

The first edition was published on 6 August 1930 under the masthead Virakesari meaning "Victorious Lion" . Subramanian guided the publication for over 20 years, during which the publication focused on the rights and grievances of the Plantation workers, capturing the attention of the Tamil speaking population.  Today, this newspaper is the most widely circulated and read newspaper by the entire Tamil speaking population in Sri Lanka.

In 1948, soon after Ceylon obtained independence from British dominance, the Ceylon Parliament enacted the Ceylon Citizenship Act. Faced with the choice of obtaining Ceylonese citizenship or continuing with his Indian citizenship, Subramanian chose to return to his homeland, unable to come to terms with losing his nationality. Before his departure, he sold his interests to a small group of Ceylonese Citizens of Indian origin.

In 1965, during the period of political upheaval in Sri Lanka, the Virakesari newspaper was taken over by a Sinhalese political party with the intention of introducing a Sinhalese national newspaper.  However, as fate would have it, the company was sued for defamation compelling the new owners to relinquish control, reverting ownership to the earlier owners.

In 1970, Express Newspapers (Ceylon) Limited was registered as a private company and as publisher of the Virakesari newspaper.  It was the intention of the Directors that as a company, expansion programs could provide for a wide range of Tamil language publications for the Tamil speaking population.

Today, Virakesari has evolved into a national newspaper with the motto "Tharamana Valiyil Thelivaana Thagaval" ["Quality news with clarity"].

Express Newspapers (Ceylon) Limited also publishes a wide range of magazines and newspapers catering to the different sectors and markets of the Tamil speaking population.

Online presence
The Online Division of Express Newspapers launched virakesari.lk, a 24x7 breaking news website, in 2002, and in 2005 they launched Virakesari's E-paper, which was the world's first Tamil E-paper. The websites boasts of over 2.5 million hits from across the world. Virakesari also plays a significant role in the field of social media having large numbers of young audience engaged on their websites. The Alexa rank of this website is under 250.

Editors
 R.Prabhakan – Editor for Sunday Edition
 S.Srikajan – Editor for Daily Edition
 Robert Anthony – News Editor for Daily Edition
 Sethuraman Ramasamy – Editor for Metronews
 Ponmalar – Editor for Mithran 
 Mohamed Fairooz – Editor for Vidivelli

Achievements 
Virakesari was voted the "Best Designed Newspaper" at the "Journalism Awards for Excellence 2005" by the Editors Guild and the Sri Lanka Press Institute.  In 2010 virakesari.lk won the title of "Sri Lankas' Favorite Tamil Website" in polling conducted by bestweb.lk.

Foreign editions 
Due to the significant numbers of SriLankan Tamil population (diaspora) spread across the world, Virakesari has become a world-renowned name in Tamil. Virakesari has a Weekly edition printed in Doha and distributed around the states of Middle East. The Sunday Virakesari is distributed in over 15 countries including United States, Canada, UK, France, Germany, India, Middle East, New Zealand and Australia.

References

External links

 E-paper

Daily newspapers published in Sri Lanka
Newspapers established in 1930
Tamil-language newspapers published in Sri Lanka
1930 establishments in Ceylon
Indian Tamil journalists of Sri Lanka